Dominga Ortiz Orzúa (November 1, 1792 - December 31, 1875) was three-time First Lady of Venezuela. She was born in Canaguá, Barinas, Captaincy General of Venezuela in 1792 and died in Caracas, Venezuela in 1875.

Personal life
Married to President José Antonio Páez, she had two children, Manuel A. Páez and María del Rosario Páez de Llamosas.

See also

List of first ladies of Venezuela
Politics of Venezuela

References

External links

1792 births
1875 deaths
People from Barinas (state)
First Ladies of Venezuela
Death in Caracas